Floodtide is a 1949 British romantic drama film directed by Frederick Wilson and starring Gordon Jackson, Rona Anderson, John Laurie and Jimmy Logan.

The film was one of the four of David Rawnsley's films that used his "independent frame" technique, a form of back projection.

Plot
A young Scotsman becomes a ship designer instead of following the family tradition and entering farming. He works his way up the firm, marries the boss's daughter, and revolutionises shipbuilding.

Cast
 Gordon Jackson as David Shields  
 Rona Anderson as Mary Anstruther  
 John Laurie as Joe Drummond  
 Jack Lambert as Anstruther  
 Jimmy Logan as Tim Brogan  
 Janet Brown as Rosie  
 Elizabeth Sellars as Judy  
 Gordon McLeod as Pursey  
 Ian McLean as Sir John  
 Archie Duncan as Charlie Campbell  
 James Woodburn as John Shields  
 Molly Weir as Mrs. McTavish  
 Ian Wallace as 1st Director  
 Alexander Archdale as 2nd Director  
 Grace Gavin as Mrs. McCrae

Critical reception
The Radio Times wrote, "the grim grandeur of the Clyde shipyards provides the setting for this lacklustre melodrama which trades on the British docudramatic tradition while dealing in potboiling clichés" ; the Oxford Times wrote, "this is a classic town-and-country saga that is spiritedly played by an exceptional Scottish ensemble" ; while Eye for Film wrote, "Industry is the real star of this film. It's full of passion for building a better future and it may well prove inspiring to engineers just starting out today."

References

External links

Review of film at Variety

1949 films
1949 romantic drama films
Films shot at Pinewood Studios
British romantic drama films
British black-and-white films
1940s English-language films
1940s British films